Reinickendorfer Straße is a Berlin U-Bahn station located on the .

History
Opened in 1923 and due to severe financial problems at the time of the station's construction, it was designed in a very simple way. The walls are plastered and only advertisement panels cover the station. On 22 May 1944, two ceiling openings in the station were created by air raids.

As the platform was only 80 m long, it was extended in 1993.

Designers of the station were Alfred Grenander, Fehse and Jennen.
The nearby chemistry company Schering would like to see this station renamed to Scheringwerke (like e.g. Borsigwerke).

References

U6 (Berlin U-Bahn) stations
Buildings and structures in Mitte
Railway stations in Germany opened in 1923